Basti is an enema of herbal oils or decoctions used in Ayurveda.

Basti is one of the five Pradhana Karmas of Panchakarma and it is used to treat vata disorders.

See also
 Ayurveda
 Basti (Hatha Yoga)

Ayurveda
Panchakarma